Mordechai Zaken also Moti Zaken (April 26, 1958 – May 14, 2021) was a historian and the 2019 laureate of "the Prime Minister Prize for the research of the Jews of the Orient."<ref>{{cite web|url= ראש הממשלה לעידוד והעצמת חקר קהילות ישראל בארצות ערב ואיראן לשנת תשע"ט הוענק עבור מחקריהם של הרב פרופ' משה עמאר, פרופ' יהודית הנשקה ודר מרדכי זקן}}</ref> He was an expert on the Kurds and Middle Eastern minorities both as academic – he was historian of the Jews, the Kurds in Kurdistan and as professional - serving as the advisor on Israeli Arabs and minorities to the prime minister, Benjamin Netanyahu (1997–1999), and to the Ministry of Public Security from 2001.

Education, expertise, prizes
Zaken earned his BA, MA, cum laude, and PhD (2003)  in Islamic Studies at the Hebrew University of Jerusalem. He studied as well in the US in both SUNY Binghamton and New York University (1987-1990). Among his influential teachers were Moshe Sharon, Benjamin Z. Kedar and the late semitic linguist , with whom he published the Book of Ruth in Neo-Aramaic. He published another Neo-Aramaic text in a book honoring Goldenberg's jubilee.

On 6 March 2019, he was announced as the laureate of "the Prime Minister Prize for the Empowerment of the research of the Jews of the Orient and Iran."Israel Hayom, 6 March 2019. 

New oral history documentation on the Jews of Kurdistan
The severe dearth of written sources on Kurdistan, drove him as a student to embark on oral history fieldwork research, conducting altogether hundreds of in-depth oral interviews with more than sixty elderly Jewish Kurdish informants, whose excellent memory was the product of oral culture. He thus saved their memories from being lost forever. This study forms a new set of historical records. His book on the Jews and the tribal Kurdish society has received wide attention and commended even in its Arabic translation, published in Beirut, as an "innovation,"The Ph.D. committee was composed by Prof. Moshe Sharon of the Hebrew University, Prof. Joyce Blau previously of INALCO, Paris, and Prof. Yona Sabar of UCLAYahud Kurdistan wa-ru'as'uhum al-qabaliyun: Dirasa fi fan al-baqa'. Transl., Su'ad M. Khader; Reviewers: Abd al-Fatah Ali Yihya and Farast Mir'i; Published by the Center for Academic Research, Beirut, 2013; يهود كردستان ورؤساؤهم القبليون : (دراسة في فن البقاء) / تأليف مردخاي زاكن ؛ ترجمة عن الانكليزية سعاد محمد خضر ؛ مراجعة عبد الفتاح علي يحيى، فرست مرعي. زاكن، مردخاي، ١٩٥٨م-;خضر، سعاد محمد; بيروت, 2013: المركز الأكاديمي للأبحاث; and has been translated as well into Kurdish, in both Sorani and Kurmanji, Persian and French.Juifs, Kurdes et Arabes, entre 1941 et 1952, Errance et Terre promise: Juifs, Kurdes, Assyro-Chaldéens, études kurdes, revue semestrielle de recherches, 2005: 7-43, translated by Sandrine Alexie.

Prime Minister's Advisor on Arabs & Minorities Affairs
Expertise in the Arab Minorities in Israel
As advisor to the Prime Minister on Arab affairs at the Prime Minister ministry (May 1997 – November 1999) he was engaged in the complex relations between the government and the communities of minorities. In 2016, within the Public Security Ministry, he formed a new governmental forum for dialogue with local Arab leaders.name="algemeiner.com1">

Forming the Government-Christian Forum
As an advisor on minorities to both the prime minister and the ministry of Public SecurityMichael R. Fischbach, Jewish property claims against Arab countries, Columbia University Press, 2013, p. 205http://business.highbeam.com/4850/article-1P1-4608014/bibi-good-arabs  he has been standing up against hate crimes.http://www.outusenglish/news/pages/greek-orthoarson_3.15.aspx 

In 2013 he initiated with Christian leaders the Government – Christians Forum that addresses the concerns of the Evangelical Christian community vis a vis the government. Two prominent Christian leaders in this forum have been Rev. Charles (Chuck) Kopp, of the Baptist Church and Rev. David Pillegi, Rector of the Christ Church in Jaffa Gate.

Founding the Israeli-Kurdistan Friendship league

In 1993, he founded the Israeli-Kurdistan Friendship League, possibly the first friendship association between Jews and any community in the Arab states, together with Moshe Zaken and Meir Baruch, Michael Niebur and Mathew B. Hand, the last two with whom he edited the newsletter Yedidut."The Wandering Kurd," (Hebrew) Davar, 2 December 1994.

In October 2012 he visited Kurdistan at the invitation of the World Kurdish Forum and in October 2013 participated in, and delivered a presentation for this forum that was held in Stockholm, Sweden.

The dispute between Muslims and Christians in Nazareth
He was the coordinator of the third Ministerial Committee set to resolve the dispute between Muslims and Christians in Nazareth regarding a dispute near the Basilica of the Annunciation, a dispute that concerned leaders throughout the world, such as the US president George W. Bush and the Pope John Paul. The daily presence of Muslim activists in the plaza near the old mosque, known as "Shihab al-Din," became an obstacle for the plan to build an open plaza for the historical visit of the Pope John Paul II in the year 2000. He constructed the final draft for the cabinet resolution, which was used by the State Attorney in the Supreme Court to repel the appeal against the government, in the years 2001–2003.http://istanbul.indymedia.org/tr/news/2011/02/271295.php 

Director of the Institute of Students and Faculty on Israel, in New York
Moti Zaken served as the last National Director of ISFI, or "The Institute of Students and Faculty on Israel," in New York, an organization under the auspices of the Israeli Foreign Ministry and the Israeli Consulate in New York City (1989–1991). ISFI provided political and cultural resources, ideas and tools, for Jewish and pro-Israel student activists throughout the US and Canada, through which Israeli oriented activities and the message of Israel could be promoted in US campuses.

Journalism, media and public speaking
In 1982, as Chief-Editor of the students' newspaper at the Hebrew University Pi-Ha'aton ("The donkey's mouth", taken from the Book of Numbers, 22:28), one of his main journalistic achievements was the unearthing of an old photograph from 1948, taken by Arabs and showing mutilated faces and bodies of Jewish soldiers that were part of an army unit that later became known as "Nabi Daniel Caravan" (שיירת נבי דניאל). He published the photograph and the story behind its discovery in a special Independence Day Edition, on 26 April 1982. He was also the Co-Chief editor of "Tipul Shoresh" (Heb.,root canal treatment) an annual newspaper of the public activists' program at the Hebrew University, the circulation of which was stopped by the directors and university administration, due to its critical approach towards the university policy regarding social issues. As a scholar, Dr. Zaken has been a frequent guest in radio and TV programs, speaking mostly on the Kurds and the minorities in the Middle East, and has been interviewed by newspapers as an expert on these subjects.

He also spoke in public on these topics.http://192.118.60.6/radio/2014/06/22/5737482.wmv http://192.118.60.6/radio/2014/08/10/5830784.mp3 

Publications
Thesis
"Tribal Chieftains and their Jewish Subjects in Kurdistan: A Comparative Study in Survival," PhD dissertation, the Hebrew University of Jerusalem, 2003.

Books (including translations)
 Jews of Kurdistan & Their tribal Chieftains: A study in survival, by Mordechai (Moti) Zaken, 2nd and Revised EBook Edition, (Jerusalem:2015).
 Jewish Subjects and their Tribal Chieftains in Kurdistan: A Study in Survival, in Jewish Identities in a Changing World, vol. 9 (Leiden and Boston): Brill, 2007. (Review of the book)
 Arabic translation: Yahud Kurdistan wa-ru'as'uhum al-qabaliyun: Dirasa fi fan al-baqa'. Transl., Su'ad M. Khader; Published by the Academic Center for Research, Beirut, 2013; يهود كردستان ورؤساؤهم القبليون : (دراسة في فن البقاء) / تأليف مردخاي زاكن ؛ ترجمة عن الانكليزية سعاد محمد خضر; بيروت, 2013 : المركز الأكاديمي للأبحاث.
 Sorani translation: D. Mordixai Zakin, Gulekekany Kurdistan, Sulaimaniyya and Arbil: 2015.
 Kurmanji translation of one part of the book: "Jews, Kurds and Arabs, between 1941 and 1952", by Dr. Amr Taher Ahmed Metîn n° 148, October 2006, p. 98-123.
 French translation of one part of the book: "Juifs, Kurdes et Arabes, entre 1941 et 1952," Errance et Terre promise: Juifs, Kurdes, Assyro-Chaldéens, etudes kurdes, revue semestrielle de recherches, 2005: 7-43, translated by Sandrine Alexie.

Selected lectures or conference participation
The third World Kurdish Scientific Congress, Stockholm, October 11–13, 2013.
The Second World Kurdish Scientific Congress, Erbil, Kurdistan, October 11–15, 2012.
Keynote Speech; "Genocide, Minorities and Memories", Symposium and Commemoration of the Armenian genocide, Hebrew University of Jerusalem, 22 April 2012.
"Jews, Kurds and Palestinians", address to the German Parliament in Berlin, 22 October 2010.

Selected articlesThe Jewish communities in Kurdistan within the tribal Kurdish society in M. Gunter, ed., Routledge Handbook on the Kurds, 2018: 181-201The Lost from the Land of Ashur – the migrations from Kurdistan and the settlement in Eretz-Israel, in A. Mizrahi and A. Ben-David, eds., The Tribes – Evidence of Israel, Exile, Immigrations, Absorption, Contribution and Integration, 2001: 340-373, Hebrew.
 Inventors’ Fate: A Folk-Tale in the Neo-Aramaic of Zakho, in M. Bar-Asher (ed.), Massorot: Studies in Language Traditions and Jewish Languages, vols. 9, 10, 11 (1997): 383-395, Hebrew.The Book of Ruth in Neo-Aramaic'', by Gideon Goldenberg and Mordechai Zaken, in W. Heinrichs (Ed.), Studies in Neo-Aramaic, Cambridge: Harvard Semitic Studies Series (1990): 151-157.

References

External links
 Information and reviews of the book by Mordechai Zaken 
 Review of the book by Mordechai Zaken 
 networks.h-net.org
 YouTube: 1, 2, 3
 www.breakingchristiannews.com
 Israel Shores Up Relations with Christian Community
 מדינת כורדיסטאן - לקראת משאל העם של הכורדים בצפון עיראק

1958 births
2021 deaths
People from Jerusalem
Hebrew University of Jerusalem alumni
Binghamton University alumni
New York University alumni
Israeli historians
Linguists from Israel
Israeli orientalists
Israeli political scientists
Israeli political consultants
Jewish historians
Jewish orientalists